Senator Hoyt may refer to:

George E. Hoyt (1861–1953), Wisconsin State Senate
Heusted W. R. Hoyt (1842–1894), Connecticut State Senate
James Henry Hoyt (1809–1873), Connecticut State Senate
Joseph W. Hoyt (1840–1902), Wisconsin State Senate
Oliver Hoyt (1823–1887), Connecticut State Senate